Sun Guan'ou (born 24 February 2000) is a Chinese footballer currently playing as a forward for Ji'nan Xingzhou, on loan from Shanghai Port.

Career statistics

Club
.

References

2000 births
Living people
People from Lu'an
Footballers from Anhui
Chinese footballers
Association football forwards
China League One players
Shanghai Port F.C. players
Inner Mongolia Zhongyou F.C. players
21st-century Chinese people